Disappearing Earth is the 2019 debut novel by Julia Phillips.

Plot
In an isolated town in Far Eastern part of Russia two young girls go missing.

Critical reception

The literary review aggregator Book Marks reported that 75% of critics gave the novel a "rave" review and 25% gave it a "positive" review, based on a sample of 20 book reviews.
 
The New York Times Book Review described the book as a "superb debut...a novel in the form of overlapping short stories about the women who are affected both directly and indirectly by the kidnapping. The purpose of these stories is not to unite a community around a tragedy as a less daring and more conventional narrative would have it, but to expose the ways in which the women of Kamchatka are fragmented personally, culturally and emotionally not only by the crime that jump-starts the novel, but by place, identity and the people who try, and often fail, to understand them."

USA Today wrote, "It could be a frustrating book for readers who require propulsive plots and clean resolutions, as it offers neither. But Phillips is so skilled at conveying place and people, you can feel the chill of the shadow cast by Soviet-style apartment buildings, smell the blood soup, taste the burn of cheap vodka drunk too fast to numb the pain."

NPR said, "Disappearing Earth comes closer in spirit to great American literature than most of the fiction set within U.S. borders."

The book was named one of the top ten books of 2019 by the New York Times Book Review.

References

American mystery novels
American thriller novels
2019 American novels
English-language novels
Alfred A. Knopf books
2019 debut novels